Aaron Krickstein was the defending champion, but did not participate this year.

Brad Gilbert won the tournament, beating Amos Mansdorf in the final, 6–3, 6–2.

Seeds

  Brad Gilbert (champion)
  Martín Jaite (second round)
  Vijay Amritraj (first round)
  Bob Green (first round)
  Shahar Perkiss (semifinals)
  Marc Flur (first round)
  Mike De Palmer (second round)
  Stefan Eriksson (first round)

Draw

Finals

Top half

Bottom half

References

 Main Draw

Tel Aviv Open
1985 Grand Prix (tennis)